Masarang Foundation , or Yayasan Masarang in Indonesian language, is an Indonesian non-profit organization. One of its programs, The Masarang Palm Sugar Factory, succeeded as one of the finalists of The World Challenge in 2007 .

History

Masarang Foundation was established on January 17, 2001, by Notary Act No. 175, and since January 22, 2001, officially registered with the department of Justice in Tondano with registration number 02/YS/2001/PN.TDO. Masarang is based in Tomohon, North Sulawesi, Indonesia. With the motto "People, Planet, Profit", Masarang aims to achieve its goal to save the environment through the active role of the local people.

The Masarang Palm Sugar Factory
Masarang Foundation has several programs, including scholarships, palm farmer groups, although the foundation is most notably for the Masarang Palm Sugar Factory program, that uses waste steam from the power plant to heat the sugar palm sap . The resulting high-quality product is now being successfully exported - with all profits going direct to the farmer's cooperative . The Masarang Palm Sugar Factory started its production after opening by President Susilo Bambang Yudhoyono on 14 January 2007 .

Notes

Tomohon
Conservation and environmental foundations
Social enterprises
Nature conservation in Indonesia
Sustainability organizations